Alan H. Tripp is an American entrepreneur. Tripp founded multiple venture-backed education companies, including SCORE! Educational Centers, InsideTrack, and Motimatic.  He is a regular speaker and contributor to the national discourse on educational technology, motivation and improving student outcomes.

Entrepreneur 
In 1992, Tripp launched SCORE!, featuring an adaptive learning system originally developed  by Stanford University professor Patrick Suppes for children in kindergarten through seventh grade. On 17 April 1996, SCORE! was acquired by The Washington Post Company. Tripp stayed on as general manager and helped open nearly 100 centers with more than 1,500 employees. More than 1 million students participated in the SCORE! program.

In 2001, Tripp co-founded InsideTrack with Kai Drekmeier. He served as CEO for 12 years and Chairman for 16 years. InsideTrack was acquired by Strada in 2017, at which point the company had served more than 1.5 million students at 1600 university programs.

Education and business background 
Tripp received a bachelor's degree in Economics in 1985 and an MBA in 1989, both from Stanford University. He was a management consultant with Boston Consulting Group (BCG) and worked as an analyst for H&Q Technology Partners. He has also worked as a reporter and editor for The Wall Street Journal.

Lecturer and education industry roles 
Tripp was appointed as a lecturer at the Stanford Graduate School of Business and the Stanford Graduate School of Education from 1999 to 2004, where he co-taught the core course for education entrepreneurs.[6] He also served as Board Chair of GreatSchools.net from 2004 to 2011 and as Entrepreneur in Residence at Penn State University from 2014-2016.

See also 
 SCORE! Educational Centers

References 

1962 births
Living people
American chief executives of education-related organizations
American computer businesspeople
American educators
American management consultants
Boston Consulting Group people
Stanford University alumni
Stanford Graduate School of Business alumni